Hazim Tahsin Said (born 1 May 1963 in Ba'adre) is the current and official Mir (Prince) of the Yezidis since July 27, 2019. Mir Hazim is the son and successor of Tahseen Beg, who after ruling Yezidis for 75 years, died at the age of 85. Mir Hazim has previously won a seat in the Kurdistan Region parliament, running as a Kurdistan Democratic Party candidate in 2009. He is married to Mayan Khairi Saeed, has two sons and a daughter. He holds a bachelor's degree in agriculture at the University of Baghdad.

Controversy on the Mir position 
The choosing of Mir Hazim by the Spiritual Council in Lalish led to a lot of criticism by some Yezidis; he was accused of having been chosen by KDP authorities to lead Yezidis and not by the Yezidi community itself. In addition, his mother is not of princely family background, thus leading many to believe that he is not a legitimate successor. As a result, some Yezidi notables, tribal leaders and factions with opposing affiliations, namely the PKK-affiliated YBŞ, recognized Naif Bin Dawud as the new Mir in Shingal. However, YBŞ commanders denied that he was affiliated with PKK, instead, claiming that he was neutral.

References 

Yazidi people
Yazidis in Iraq
1963 births
Living people